Merton "Buddy" Banker was an American football player. He played halfback for the Tulane Green Wave football team from 1937 to 1939. He was considered a triple-threat man who helped lead the 1939 Tulane Green Wave football team to the Southeastern Conference championship. His older brother, Bill Banker, was an All-American halfback for Tulane in 1929.

Banker was selected by the Washington Redskins in the third round (23rd overall pick) of the 1940 NFL Draft. He was offered a contract, but opted not to play professional football.

References

American football halfbacks
Tulane Green Wave football players
Players of American football from Louisiana
1910s births
Year of death missing